The National Bee Journal was a monthly periodical that was published from 1870 to 1874 and which was exclusively devoted to the culture of the honey bee. The first two volumes were published under the titles Indianapolis Illustrated Bee Journal and Indianapolis National Bee Journal. In November 1873 the printing office of the journal relocated from Indianapolis to Des Moines, where Ellen Smith Tupper became its editor and proprietor. It therefore became one of the first journals in the field of biology that had a woman as editor in chief. In 1874 the journal ceased publication and it was consolidated with the American Bee Journal, which at the time was the only other existing nationwide periodical on beekeeping in the United States.

Editors:

N.C. Mitchell 
Ellen Smith Tupper (1873-1874)

Corresponding editors:
L.C. Waite
A.J. Pope
Mrs. Thomas Atkinson

References 

Magazines established in 1870
Magazines disestablished in 1874
Monthly magazines published in the United States
1870 establishments in Indiana
1874 disestablishments in Iowa
Bees
Magazines published in Indianapolis
Magazines published in Iowa